The William and Florence Schmidt Art Center is a 6,500-square-foot art museum located on the Belleville Campus of Southwestern Illinois College, which houses a collection of over 900 works of art and artifacts, the largest permanent collection of any two-year college in the state of Illinois. In addition to paintings, photography, and pre-Columbian artifacts, the outdoor sculptures and collection were mostly acquired through private donation and funds from the Illinois Art in Architecture program.

The art center features exhibitions by professional artists within its four galleries every six to eight weeks, offers arts education programming, and hosts concerts and related cultural events.

References

External links

Buildings and structures in Belleville, Illinois
Art museums and galleries in Illinois
University museums in Illinois
Museums in St. Clair County, Illinois
Art museums established in 2001
2001 establishments in Illinois
Southwestern Illinois College